The 1967 Australia Cup was the sixth season of the Australia Cup, which was the main national association football knockout cup competition in Australia. Sixteen clubs from around Australia qualified to enter the competition.

Teams

Round of 16

Western Division

Eastern Division

Quarter-finals

Semi-finals

Final

References

NSL Cup
Aust
Australia Cup (1962–1968) seasons